Mitchell Dickenson (born 14 September 1996) is an English professional footballer who plays as a defender for Eastbourne Borough and the England C team.

Club career
Dickenson came through the youth ranks at Gillingham, and signed professional terms in March 2015. In March 2016 he signed for a month on loan with Isthmian League Division One South side Hastings United.

He made his senior debut on 30 August 2016, in a 2–1 defeat to Luton Town in an EFL Trophy match at Priestfield Stadium. Dickenson made his English Football League debut away at Bury on 4 March 2017, coming on as a first half substitute for the injured Ryan Jackson. On 20 May 2017, Gillingham announced that Dickenson had been released at the end of his contract.

On 29 July 2017, he signed for Isthmian League South Division side Hythe Town. He joined Hemel Hempstead Town in the summer of 2019. In August 2019, Dickenson signed for Hornchurch, before returning to Hemel in September.

Career statistics

References

1996 births
Living people
Sportspeople from Maidstone
Footballers from Kent
English footballers
Association football defenders
Gillingham F.C. players
Hastings United F.C. players
Hythe Town F.C. players
Hemel Hempstead Town F.C. players
Hornchurch F.C. players
Eastbourne Borough F.C. players
English Football League players
National League (English football) players
Isthmian League players